The R632 road is a regional road in County Cork, Ireland. It travels from Castlemartyr to Shanagarry, via Ladysbridge.

References

Regional roads in the Republic of Ireland
Roads in County Cork